"Polka Dots and Moonbeams" is a popular song with music by Jimmy Van Heusen and lyrics by Johnny Burke, published in 1940. It was Frank Sinatra's first hit recorded with the Tommy Dorsey Orchestra. The song is one of the top 100 most-frequently recorded jazz standards with arrangements by Gil Evans and others and notable recordings by Bill Evans, Chet Baker, Blue Mitchell, Wes Montgomery, Sarah Vaughan (for the 1957 album Swingin' Easy), Bud Powell, 
Lester Young, Gerry Mulligan, Lou Donaldson, Dexter Gordon and many others American songwriter and guitarist John Denver also covered the song on his 1976 Spirit album. Bob Dylan covered this song in his 2016 album Fallen Angels.

During the song's first year, a fashion designer even created a "Polka Dots and Moonbeams" fabric print as part of a series of prints inspired by popular music.

References

Songs with music by Jimmy Van Heusen
Songs with lyrics by Johnny Burke (lyricist)
1940 songs
1940s jazz standards
Jazz compositions in F major